County Buildings is a municipal complex in Wellington Square, Ayr, Scotland. The complex serves as the meeting place of South Ayrshire Council. The original structure, the former sheriff court at the eastern end of the complex, is Category A listed building, while the main office building at the western end of the complex, is a Category B listed building.

History

The earliest part of the complex is the sheriff court: it was designed by Robert Wallace in the neoclassical style, built in ashlar stone at a cost of £30,000 and was completed in 1818. The design involved a symmetrical main frontage with eleven bays facing onto Wellington Square with the end bays slightly projected forward; the central section of three bays featured a tetrastyle portico with Ionic order columns supporting an entablature and a pediment.  The building was fenestrated with round headed windows on the ground floor and sash windows on the first floor.  At roof level, there was a cornice, a balustrade and a large central dome. Internally, the principal rooms were the two courtrooms. There was originally a prison at the rear of the building.

The building continued to be used as a facility for dispensing justice but, following the implementation of the Local Government (Scotland) Act 1889, which established county councils in every county, one of the courtrooms was allocated for use as the meeting place of Ayrshire County Council.

In the early 1930s, county leaders decided to demolish the old prison and to extend the building to the west to provide bespoke offices for the county council. The foundation stone for the extension, which was much larger than the original building, was laid by the Duke of York, who was accompanied by the Duchess of York, on 10 July 1931. It was designed by Alexander Mair in the neoclassical style and was completed in 1935. The design involved a symmetrical main frontage with seventeen bays facing towards the sea with the end three bays on either side slightly projected forward as pavilions; the central section of three bays featured a tetrastyle portico with piers and Ionic order columns supporting an entablature and a pediment with a coat of arms in the tympanum. It was fenestrated with sash windows on both floors and most of the first floor windows were enhanced with balconies. Internally, the principal rooms were the council chamber and the committee rooms, which were named after the five burghs of the county, on the first floor.

A memorial designed by Pilkington Jackson, commemorating the lives of soldiers of the Royal Scots Fusiliers who had died in the Second World War, was unveiled in the garden of the County Buildings in 1960. Following the abolition of Ayrshire County Council, the complex became a sub-regional office of Strathclyde Regional Council in 1975, and then, after the introduction of unitary authorities, it became the headquarters of South Ayrshire Council in 1996.

Works of art in the county buildings include a portrait by Daniel Macnee of Colonel John Hamilton of the 3rd Dragoon Guards, a portrait by John Graham-Gilbert of Archibald Montgomerie, 13th Earl of Eglinton and a portrait by George Reid of Lieutenant Colonel Lieutenant Colonel William Kentigern Hamilton-Campbell.

See also
 List of listed buildings in Ayr, South Ayrshire
 List of Category A listed buildings in South Ayrshire

References

Government buildings completed in 1818
Buildings and structures in Ayr
Category A listed buildings in South Ayrshire
Category B listed buildings in South Ayrshire
Ayr